Vincent Kesteloot (born 23 March 1995) is a Belgian professional basketball player for USC Heidelberg of the Basketball Bundesliga (BBL).

Professional career
Kesteloot started his professional career in 2014 with Okapi Aalstar. In his rookie season, he won the Belgian League Most Promising Player Award.

On 13 June 2016, Kesteloot signed a two-year deal with Oostende. On 17 June 2018, he extended his contract with one more year until 2019. With Oostende, Kesteloot won the Belgian Pro Basketball League three consecutive seasons.

On 2 July 2019, Kesteloot signed a two-year contract with Telenet Giants Antwerp.

On September 1, 2021, he has signed with Spirou of the BNXT League.

On October 1, 2022, he signed with USC Heidelberg of the Basketball Bundesliga.

International career
Kesteloot represented Belgium at the 2015 FIBA Europe Under-20 Championship.

References

External links
Eurobasket.com Profile

1995 births
Living people
Antwerp Giants players
BC Oostende players
Belgian expatriate basketball people in Germany
Belgian men's basketball players
Belgium national basketball players
Okapi Aalstar players
Small forwards
Sportspeople from Antwerp